Crookedest street may refer to:

Vermont Street (San Francisco), a sinuous street in California, US
Lombard Street (San Francisco), a sinuous street in California, US
Snake Alley (Burlington, Iowa), a sinuous street in Iowa, US